Grace Lee is an American politician and businesswoman serving as a member of the New York State Assembly for the 65th district. Elected in November 2022, she assumed office on January 1, 2023.

Education 
Lee earned a Bachelor of Arts degree in economics and philosophy from Columbia University in 2002 and a Master of Business Administration in finance and entrepreneurship from the University of Chicago Booth School of Business.

Career 
From 2002 to 2006, Lee worked as an equity research associate at JPMorgan Chase. She briefly worked as an equity research associate at UBS before joining FSI Group, LLC in 2007. She founded Nine Naturals, a skincare company in 2008. Lee was an unsuccessful candidate for the 65th district in 2020, losing to incumbent Yuh-Line Niou. Lee was elected to the State Assembly in November 2022 and has served since January 1, 2023.

References 

Living people
Columbia College (New York) alumni
University of Chicago Booth School of Business alumni
New York (state) Democrats
Businesspeople from New York (state)
Businesspeople from New York City
People from the Lower East Side
JPMorgan Chase people
UBS people
American politicians of Korean descent
Members of the New York State Assembly
Women state legislators in New York (state)
21st-century American politicians
21st-century American women politicians
Year of birth missing (living people)